Dave Hardie (8 February 1928 – 9 June 2003) was a former Australian rules footballer who played with Melbourne in the Victorian Football League (VFL).

Notes

External links 

Dave Hardie on Demonwiki

1928 births
2003 deaths
Australian rules footballers from Victoria (Australia)
Melbourne Football Club players